The 1909 Miami Redskins football team was an American football team that represented Miami University as an independent during the 1909 college football season. In head coach Harold Iddings' first year, the Redskins compiled a 3–4 record and outscored their opponents 96 to 83.

Schedule

References

Miami
Miami RedHawks football seasons
Miami Redskins football